Betsy Hands is a Democratic Party member of the Montana House of Representatives, representing District 99 since 2007.

Personal information
Betsy Hands knows how to speak French.

Education
The schools that Betsy Hands attended were:
University of Montana
University of Michigan
Breck School

Career
Hands currently is the Executive Director at Montana Smart Growth Coalition and Representative at Montana State Legislature.

Previous career
Energy and Conservation Director at Western Environmental Law Center
Director at Hands on Consulting
Mickelson Fellow at Western Governors' Association
Executive Director at Homeword
Adjunct professor and research assistant at University of Montana
Intern at Rocky Mountain Institute
Instructor and Course Director at Outward Bound
Community Extension Agent at Peace Corps

External links
Montana House of Representatives - Betsy Hands official MT State Legislature website
Project Vote Smart - Representative Betsy Hands (MT) profile
Follow the Money - Betsy Hands
2008 2006 campaign contributions

References

Democratic Party members of the Montana House of Representatives
Year of birth missing (living people)
Living people
Women state legislators in Montana
University of Montana alumni
University of Michigan alumni
University of Montana faculty
Politicians from Missoula, Montana
American women academics
21st-century American women